Hal Dacosta S. Padmore (12 November 1927 in Barbados – February 1995 in Essex, England) was a Canadian cricketer. He was a right-handed batsman and right-arm medium pace bowler. He played three first-class matches for Canada between 1951 and 1954, taking 14 wickets at an average of 22.28.

References
 Cricket Archive profile
 Cricinfo profile

1927 births
1995 deaths
Canadian cricketers
Barbadian emigrants to Canada